San Luis del Palmar Department is a  department of Corrientes Province in Argentina.

Settlements
Herlitzka
San Luis del Palmar

Departments of Corrientes Province